Anthene crawshayi, Crawshay's hairtail or Crawshay's ciliate blue, is a butterfly in the family Lycaenidae. It is found in Senegal, the Gambia, Guinea-Bissau, Burkina Faso, Guinea, Sierra Leone, Ivory Coast, Ghana, Togo, Nigeria, Cameroon, Sudan, Uganda, Ethiopia, Somalia, Kenya, Tanzania, the Democratic Republic of the Congo, Malawi, Zambia, Zimbabwe and South Africa. The habitat consists of savanna and open forests.

Adult males mud-puddle and both sexes are attracted to the flowers of Acacia trees. Adults are on wing year round.

The larvae feed on the young terminal shoots of Acacia abyssinica, Acacia polycantha campylacantha, Cassia alata and Entada abyssinica. They are green with a dark dorsal line and with dark diagonal lateral stripes.

Subspecies
Anthene crawshayi crawshayi (Senegal, the Gambia, Guinea-Bissau, Burkina Faso, Guinea, Sierra Leone, Ivory Coast, Ghana, Togo, Nigeria: south and the Cross River loop, Cameroon, Uganda, western Kenya, Tanzania, Malawi, Zambia, north-eastern Zimbabwe, South Africa: Limpopo Province, Democratic Republic of the Congo: Uele, Ituri, Kinshasa, Sankuru, Lualaba, Lomani, Shaba, Maniema and Kivu)
Anthene crawshayi minuta (Bethune-Baker, 1916) (Sudan, Ethiopia, northern Uganda, Somalia, east and northern Kenya)

References

Butterflies described in 1899
Anthene
Butterflies of Africa
Taxa named by Arthur Gardiner Butler